The Planisphaerium is a work by Ptolemy.  The title can be translated as "celestial plane" or "star chart". In this work Ptolemy explored the mathematics of mapping figures inscribed in the celestial sphere onto a plane by what is now known as stereographic projection.  This method of projection preserves the properties of circles.

Publication

Originally written in Ancient Greek, Planisphaerium was one of many scientific works which survived from antiquity in Arabic translation.  One reason why Planisphaerium attracted interest was that stereographic projection was the mathematical basis of the plane astrolabe, an instrument which was widely used in the medieval Islamic world. In the 12th century the work was translated from Arabic into Latin by Herman of Carinthia, who also translated commentaries by Maslamah Ibn Ahmad al-Majriti. The oldest known translation is in Arabic done by an unknown scholar as part of the Translation Movement in Baghdad.

Planisphere

The word planisphere (Latin planisphaerium) was originally used in the second century by Ptolemy to describe the representation of a spherical Earth by a map drawn in the plane.

 Planisphere

References

External links
"Ptolemy on Astrolabes"

Ancient Greek mathematical works
Astronomy books
Works by Ptolemy